Chien Te-men (28 August 1943 – 5 February 2018) was a Taiwanese actor.

Selected filmography
New Legend of Madame White Snake (1992) as Fahai.
The Heaven Sword and Dragon Saber (1994).
The Rose (2003).
KO One (2005).
The Hospital (2006).
Bull Fighting (2007).
Sweet Relationship (2007).
The X-Family (2007).
Black & White (2009).
K.O.3an Guo (2009).
Down with Love (2010).
Black & White Episode I: The Dawn of Assault (2012).
Ti Amo Chocolate (2012).
Deja Vu (2013).
Angel 'N' Devil (2014).
Mr. Right Wanted (2014).
Bitter Sweet (2015).
Taste of Love (2015).
KO ONE: RE-CALL (2018).

References

External links

1943 births
2018 deaths
Taiwanese people of Mongolian descent
National Chengchi University alumni
21st-century Taiwanese male actors
Taiwanese male television actors
Taiwanese male film actors
20th-century Taiwanese male actors